Cipollino marble ("onion-stone") was a variety of marble used by the ancient Greeks and Romans, whose Latin term for it was marmor carystium (meaning "marble from Karystos"). It was quarried in several locations on the south-west coast of the Greek island of Euboea, between the modern-day cities of Styra and Karystos. Some of these ancient quarries survive with a mine-face of over 100 metres.

It has a white-green base, with thick wavy green ribs, held onto the path by strata of mica. The colour of its base and grain grows darker the further north the location of the quarry. It is a metamorphic rock, a crystalline marble with crystals between 0.2 and 0.6 mm, with coloured veins of epidote and chlorite. A marble similar in appearance to cipollino marble was mined in the Iberian peninsula at the Anasol mines, and on the Alpi Apuane, in north-west Greece and Serbia.

First used in ancient Greece, it was exported to Rome from the 1st century BC onwards; in his Natural History, Pliny the Elder tells how columns of this marble were used in the home of the eques Claudius Mamurra, who had been an engineer for Julius Caesar in his Gallic Wars. The quarries yielding it became imperial property, and cipollino marble became common throughout Rome during the imperial period. It was principally used for column shafts, including large and mainly smooth ones, such as the columns of the pronaos of the temple of Antoninus and Faustina in the Forum in Rome. It was also used for sculpture, such as that of a crocodile in the Canopus at the Villa Adriana at Tivoli, where its colour was used to imitate the colour of crocodile skin. It continued to be mined and used by the Byzantine Empire well into the 5th century AD.

See also
List of types of marble

References

External links 
Article on cipollino marble at the Museo di Storia Naturale dell'Accademia dei Fisiocritici di Siena.
Images of shipwrecked cipollino marble, near Porto Cesareo.

Marble